Events from the year 1995 in South Korea.

Incumbents
President: Kim Young Sam
Prime Minister: Lee Hong-koo until December 18, Lee Soo-sung

Events
Multiple municipalities are annexed into larger amalgamations.

January

February

March
March 1 – Yonhap Television News was official start on broadcasting for 24-hours news channel.

April
April 28 – A gas explosion in a subway construction site caused about 100 deaths in Daegu.

May

June
June 27 – Local and provincial elections showed defeat of the ruling party of Kim Young-sam.
June 29 – The Sampoong Department Store collapse caused 502 deaths in Seoul.

July
July 26 – Tropical Storm Janis hit near Seoul, South Korea. The storm lasted until the 28th.

August
 August 15 – The demolition of the Japanese General Government Building in Seoul began.

September
September 5 – Kim Dae-Jung formed a new political party named National Congress for New Politics.

October
October 27 – Former President Roh Tae-woo made a public apology about secret funds scandal.

November
November 16 – Former President Roh Tae-woo was arrested on charges of corruption, illegal financing.

December
December 3 – Former President Chun Doo-hwan was arrested on charges of leading bloody suppression in Coup d'état of December Twelfth, Gwangju Democratic Uprising.  
 December 6 – Democratic Liberal Party was established to New Korea Party. 
 December 18 – Lee Soo-sung becomes prime minister of South Korea, replacing Lee Hong-koo

Births

January 
 January 3 – Kim Seolhyun, actress, singer, and dancer. Member of AOA
 January 3 – Jisoo, actress, singer, and dancer. Member of Blackpink
 January 5 – Kim Young-Gyu, footballer
 January 9 – Ha Seung-ri, actress
 January 20 – Lee Suwoong, dancer and vocalist in Boys Republic
 January 21 – Choi Ah Ra, actress
 January 22 – Shin Hyejin, dancer and singer in Oh My Girl
 January 23 – Lee Yoo-young, dancer and singer member of Hello Venus

February 
 February 6 
 Kim Dam-Min, short track speed skater
 Moon Jong Up, dancer and singer
 February 8 – Song Yunhyeong, singer in IKON
 February 9 – Kim Min-Sun, golfer
 February 11 – Kim Hae-Lin, figure skater
 February 13 – Lee Geon-Wook, baseball player
 February 15 – Go Min-si, actress, model and director
 February 27 – Ricky (Yoo Chang-hyun) vocalist and Dancer in Teen Top

March 

 March 14 – Park Ji-bin, actor
 March 20 – Kei (Kim Ji-Yeon) lead singer In Lovelyz

April 
 April 9 – Kim Da-mi, actress
  April 11 - Lee Do hyun , actor 
 April 15 – Kim Nam-joo, dancer and singer 
 April 17
 Ahn Hyo-seop [Actor]
 Jung Whee-in, singer and dance in Mamamoo 

 April 24
 Jo Youngmin singer and dancer in Boyfriend 
 Jo Kwangmin rapper and dancer in Boyfriend

May 
 May 1 – Kim Mi-hyun (Mimi) dancer and rapper in Oh My Girl
 May 2 – Yook Sungjae, actor, singer in BTOB
 May 8
 Park Junghwa dancer and singer in EXID
 Kim Hye-jun, actress
 May 23 – Kim Sanggyun (A-Tom) rapper in Topp Dogg

June 
 June 8 – JR (Kim Jong Hyun) rapper in NU'EST
 June 16 – Ki Hui-hyeon, rapper and dancer, member of DIA
 June 29 – Choi Ri, actress

July 
 July 1 – Lee Tae-yong, rapper and leader of NCT
 July 5 – Hyuk (Han Sang-hyuk) singer, actor, and member of VIXX
 July 16 – Park Hyung-Joo, swimmer
 July 21 – Baekho (Kang Dong-ho) singer and dancer in NU'EST
 July 23 – Hwasa (Ahn Hyejin) singer and dancer in Mamamoo
 July 31 – No Minwoo, dancer and rapper in Boyfriend

August 
 August 8 – S.Coups (Choi Seungcheol) rapper in boy group Seventeen
 August 9 – Hwang Minhyun, singer in NU'EST
 August 19 – Bona, singer and actress, member of Cosmic Girls
 August 25 – Yoon Do-woon, drummer of Day6
 August 25 – Ong Seongwoo, singer in Wanna One

September 
 September 10 – D.ana (Jo Eun-ae), rapper in Sonamoo
 September 17
 Nam Ji-hyun, actress
 YooA (Yoo Shi-a), Singer and dancer in Oh My Girl
 September 22 – Im Na-yeon, singer, dancer, and leader in Twice
 September 27 – Yano (Seo Sangwon), rapper in Topp Dogg

October 
 October 1 – Siyeon former member of Minx and member of Dreamcatcher
 October 4 – Yoon Jeonghan, singer in boy group Seventeen
 October 10 – Oh Seunghee, leader and vocalist in CLC
 October 13 – Park Ji-min, dancer and singer from BTS
 October 26 – Nakamoto Yuta, lead dancer, sub-vocalist, and the sub-rapper of NCT 127 and NCT U. He is one of two Japanese members in NCT. NCT 127 and NCT U
 October 31 – Kim Ji Ae, vocalist in 
Wassup

November 
 November 3 – Ren (Choi Min-Ki) vocalist and dancer in NU'EST
 November 16 – Changjo (Choi Jong-hyun) Vocalist and dancer in Teen Top

December 
 December 7 – Sowon (Kim So-Jung) actress, and leader of GFriend 
 December 9 – Kim Na-hyun, visual and vocalist in Sonamoo
 December 11 – Shinwon, singer in Pentagon
 December 14 – Chan, main dancer and vocalist in Victon
 December 18 – Lim Na-young, singer and rapper, member of I.O.I
 December 21 – Bobby, South Korean-American rapper
 December 30 –  

 V (Kim Tae-hyung), singer in BTS

Deaths

See also
List of South Korean films of 1995

References

 
South Korea
Years of the 20th century in South Korea
South Korea
1990s in South Korea